The 2017 IIHF Inline Hockey World Championship was the 20th and final IIHF Inline Hockey World Championship, an international inline hockey tournament run by the International Ice Hockey Federation. The World Championship runs alongside the 2017 IIHF Inline Hockey World Championship Division I tournament and took place between 25 June and 1 July 2017 in Bratislava, Slovakia at the Ondrej Nepela Arena. The tournament was won by the United States, earning their seventh World Championship title. Finland finished in second place and the Czech Republic in third after defeating Sweden in the bronze medal match.

Qualification
Seven of the eight teams automatically qualified for the 2017 IIHF Inline Hockey World Championship while the eighth spot was awarded to the winner of the 2015 IIHF Inline Hockey World Championship Division I tournament. The 2015 Division I tournament was won by Croatia who defeated Australia in the final to earn promotion to the World Championship.

 − Finished first in the 2015 World Championship
 − Winner of 2015 IIHF Inline Hockey World Championship Division I
 − Finished sixth in the 2015 World Championship
 − Finished second in the 2015 World Championship
 − Finished seventh in the 2015 World Championship
 − Finished fourth in the 2015 World Championship
 − Finished third in the 2015 World Championship
 − Finished fifth in the 2015 World Championship

Seeding and groups
The seeding in the preliminary round was based on the final standings at the 2015 IIHF Inline Hockey World Championship and 2015 IIHF Inline Hockey World Championship Division I. The World Championship groups are named Group A and Group B while the 2017 IIHF Inline Hockey World Championship Division I tournament use Group C and Group D, as both tournaments were held in Bratislava, Slovakia. The teams were grouped accordingly by seeding at the previous year's tournament (in parenthesis is the corresponding seeding):

Group A
 (1)
 (4)
 (5)
 (8)

Group B
 (2)
 (3)
 (6)
 (7)

Preliminary round
Eight participating teams were placed in the following two groups. After playing a round-robin, every team advanced to the Playoff round.

All times are local (UTC+2).

Group A

Group B

Playoff round
All eight teams advanced into the playoff round and were seeded into the quarterfinals according to their result in the preliminary round. The winning quarter finalists advanced through to the semifinals, while the losing teams moved through to the classification round. Slovakia defeated Croatia and Canada defeated Germany in the classification round to finish fifth and sixth respectively. Croatia and Germany moved on to the relegation game where Croatia was defeated 5–8 and was relegated back to Division I for 2019. In the semifinals the United States defeated the Czech Republic and Finland beat Sweden, both advancing to the gold medal game. After losing the semifinals the Czech Republic and Sweden played off for the bronze medal with the Czech Republic winning 5–2. The United States defeated Finland 4–2 in the gold medal game, earning their seventh World Championship title.

All times are local (UTC+2).

Quarterfinals

Classification

Semifinals

Relegation game

Bronze medal game

Gold medal game

Ranking and statistics

Tournament Awards
Best players selected by the directorate:
Best Goalkeeper:  Troy Redmann
Best Defenseman:  Petri Partanen
Best Forward:  Matt White

Final standings
The final standings of the tournament according to IIHF:

Scoring leaders

List shows the top skaters sorted by points, then goals. If the list exceeds 10 skaters because of a tie in points, all of the tied skaters are shown.

Leading goaltenders

Only the top five goaltenders, based on save percentage, who have played at least 40% of their team's minutes are included in this list.

References

External links
World Championship at IIHF.com

IIHF Inline Hockey World Championship
IIHF Inline Hockey World Championship
2017
International sports competitions hosted by Slovakia
Inline hockey in Slovakia
June 2017 sports events in Europe
July 2017 sports events in Europe
Sports competitions in Bratislava